Rudolph Edgar Block (December 6, 1870 – April 29, 1940) was a Jewish American journalist, columnist, and author. Much of his writing was done under the pen name of Bruno Lessing.

Biography
Rudolph Block began his career as a journalist in 1888.  He worked first as a news reporter on The New York Sun and later joined The New York World. In 1896 he became the editor of the comic supplements to the Hearst newspapers, a position he held for the next twenty-eight years. During his tenure he supplied text for The Yellow Kid and helped to create such  popular series as Happy Hooligan and The Katzenjammer Kids. As Bruno Lessing his short stories chronicled life in the Jewish ghetto of New York City. Between 1905 and 1909 many of these tales were published by Cosmopolitan, which at that time was a literary magazine. During the years 1915 – 1916 he also wrote a number of screenplays depicting the Jewish American experience.

Ambrose Bierce, another frequent contributor to Cosmopolitan, mentioned Block in his satirical work The Devil's Dictionary, recounting the author's alleged encounter with a prominent critic. A short poem by Bierce, titled "Rudolph Block", had likewise no apparent connection to the man himself.

An avid traveler, Block wrote about his experiences in the daily newspaper column "Vagabondia", which was published from 1928 through 1939. Along the way he amassed a collection of 1,400 walking sticks, although he himself walked unaided. After his death, the  collection of canes, each made from a unique type of wood, was donated to Yale University.

Selected works
1903 Children Of Men 
1909 Jake Or Sam
1914 With The Best Intention

References

External links
 
 
 Bruno Lessing photo 1903
 Articles
Bruno Lessing profile 1903
Bruno Lessing interview 1916
Bruno Lessing obituary 1940
"The End of the Task" 
Short story: pp. 600–607. 
Dramatic reading by Ethel Olson.

1870 births
1940 deaths
American columnists
American male journalists
American short story writers
Jewish American writers
Writers from New York City
American male short story writers